New Harmony is an unincorporated community in Brown County, in the U.S. state of Ohio.

History
New Harmony was laid out in 1847. A post office called New Harmony was established in 1851, and remained in operation until 1907.

References

Unincorporated communities in Brown County, Ohio
Populated places established in 1847
1847 establishments in Ohio
Unincorporated communities in Ohio